The fusion of the Belgian municipalities (French: fusion des communes, Dutch: fusie van Belgische gemeenten) was a Belgian political process that rationalized and reduced the number of municipalities in Belgium between 1975 and 1983. In 1961, there were 2,663 such municipalities; by 1983, these had been re-arranged and combined into 589 municipalities.

The project of merging a number of local authorities to improve service delivery by streamlining administration and creating economies of scale was the work of the government headed by Leo Tindemans (1974–1978), and in particular of Interior Minister Joseph Michel. The legal framework in which the mergers would be implemented was laid out in an act passed by the Belgian Parliament on 30 December 1975.

21st century
The regionalisation of local government organisation slowly renewed the question of municipality merging, especially in Flanders. The Flemish, Walloon and Brussels Regions became responsible for their respective municipalities in 2001. The Flemish decree of 24 June 2016 on the Voluntary Merging of Municipalities created a regulated procedure, including a financial incentive for municipalities who merge. After decades without any change, some municipalities began seriously considering a fusion.

Fifteen Flemish municipalities were merged into seven per 1 January 2019, reducing the number of Flemish municipalities from 308 to 300, and the Belgian total from 589 to 581.

As of 2022, several more municipalities are in the process of merging by 1 January 2025.

See also
 List of municipalities of the Brussels-Capital Region (19 municipalities)
 List of municipalities of the Flemish Region (300 municipalities)
 List of municipalities in Wallonia (262 municipalities)

References

Geographic history of Belgium
Municipalities of Belgium
Mergers of administrative divisions
1970s in Belgium
1980s in Belgium